Brother Sun, Sister Moon is a 1972 film directed by Franco Zeffirelli and starring Graham Faulkner and Judi Bowker. The film is an examination of the life of Saint Francis of Assisi.

Plot
Francesco, the spoiled son of Pietro Bernardone, a wealthy textile merchant, returns from fighting in the war between Assisi and Perugia a changed man. Struck by a feverish illness that has forced him to leave the war, Francesco lies on his bed tormented by visions of his past when he was a boisterous, arrogant youth. During a long recovery process, he slowly finds God in poverty, chastity and obedience, experiencing a physical and spiritual renewal.

Healthy again, Francesco returns to his normal life as a rich young man. However, to the consternation of his parents, he begins to spend most of his time surrounded by nature, flowers, trees, animals and poetry as he becomes more and more reluctant to resume his prior lifestyle. Pietro's obsession with gold now fills Francesco with revulsion, creating an open confrontation between Francesco and Pietro.

Francesco wanders into the basement where the family business is located. He feels the heat and humidity of the dye vats, passing through colorful lots of drying cloth, to see the workers with their families laboring in the heat without much rest. Rejecting his father's offer to take over the family business, he instead pulls the laborers out of the building to enjoy the daylight. Then he throws the costly textiles out of the window to the poor gathered below. When his father sees the loss, Francesco invites him to join in throwing the cloth out the window so he can know the joy of being free of worldly possessions.

Pietro, completely frustrated, beats Francesco, drags him to the bishop's palace and humiliates his son in front of Assisi's bishop and the rest of the population. Lovingly, Francesco renounces all worldly possessions and his middle-class family including the name "Bernardone", removes his brilliant clothing and leaves Assisi, naked and free from his past, to live in the beauties of nature as an ascetic to enjoy a simple life as a man of God.

Francesco comes upon the ruins of the chapel of San Damiano, where he hears God's voice asking him to "restore My Church." Believing the Voice means San Damiano, Francesco begins to beg for rocks to rebuild that church. Much to the dismay of his family, some of Francesco's friends join him. He gradually gains a following from the sons of the wealthy, who begin to minister among the poor and the suffering.

The bishop supports Francesco, since he is rebuilding a church without pay and performing the works of mercy Christ demands of His followers. Francesco's friend Bernardo happily joins him after returning from the Fourth Crusade, a venture that left him in sorrow and emptiness. Two other friends, Silvestro and Giocondo, admiring Francesco's new vocation, help to rebuild San Damiano.

During a rainy afternoon, Francesco and his friends separate to beg food from the families of Assisi. Francesco comes to his family's home. Seeking forgiveness, he begins to recite the Beatitudes, causing his mother much anguish while Pietro pretends not to hear, refusing to be reconciled with their son.

Clare, a beautiful young woman also from a wealthy family, serves and cares for lepers of the community. She joins the brothers in their life of poverty. Meanwhile, in Assisi, the city's nobility and wealthy merchandising families protest against Francesco and his group, worried about them "corrupting" the whole of Assisi's youth, and they command Francesco's friend Paolo to hinder and stop the so-called "minor brothers."

One day the rebuilt chapel is set on fire, and one of Francesco's followers is killed. (This scene, introduced for dramatic effect, is unhistorical.) That people can hate so much causes Francesco much sorrow. He blames himself but cannot understand what he has done wrong. He then decides to walk to Rome and to seek out the answers from Pope Innocent III.

In Rome, Francesco is stunned by the enormous wealth and power shown in the clothing of the papal court surrounding the throne of St. Peter. When granted an audience with the Pope, Francesco breaks from reciting Paolo's carefully prepared script and calmly protests against pomp and worldliness, reciting some of Jesus' words from the Sermon on the Mount praising humility to protest that Christ's teachings are totally opposite to Rome's obsession with wealth. The cardinals, bishops and abbots of the papal court are insulted at having the words of Jesus thrown in their faces. Francesco and his friends are expelled. Finally accepting his admiration toward Francesco, Paolo decides to join them. Francesco tries to protect Paolo, saying that he is not one of them, but his friend insists on joining the friars, convincing Francesco of the sincerity of his conversion, and they are put out with the others.

On his throne Pope Innocent, seemingly waking from a dream, orders Francesco and his friends to be brought back. The Pope addresses Francesco: "In our obsession with original sin we have forgotten original innocence." In language from one of the Psalms, Innocent prays that Francesco's order "flourish like the palm."

Then to everyone's astonishment, Pope Innocent kneels, kisses Francesco's feet and blesses him and his companions, wishing for them a long worldwide society of men and women willing to serve God in humility. One of the final lines places the sincerity of the Pope's response in question when an unnamed cardinal, observing what the Pope has done, comments to a bishop: "Don't be alarmed, His Holiness knows what he is doing. This is the man who will speak to the poor, and bring them back to us."

The film finishes with the sight of Francesco slowly walking alone into the distance in the countryside as Donovan sings "Brother Sun and Sister Moon."

Cast
 Graham Faulkner as Francesco di Bernardone
 Judi Bowker as Clare Offreduccio
 Leigh Lawson as Bernardo di Quintavalle
 Kenneth Cranham as Paolo
 Lee Montague as Pietro di Bernardone
 Valentina Cortese as Pica di Bernardone
 Alec Guinness as Pope Innocent III
 Michael Feast as Silvestro
 Nicholas Willatt as Giocondo
 John Sharp as Bishop Guido
 Adolfo Celi as Consul
 Francesco Guerrieri as Deodato
 Sandro Dori as Pietro di Bernardone's servant
 Aristide Caporale as Derelict
 Alfredo Bianchini as Assisiite priest
 Robin Askwith as Assisiite gatekeeper
 Fortunato Arena as Assisiite official 1
 Carlo Hinterman as Assisiite official 2
 Nerina Montagnani as Old beggaress
 Carlo Pisacane as St. Damian's priest
 Renato Terra Caizzi as Old peasant
 Carleton Hobbs as Pope's secretary
 Massimo Foschi as Young Spanish cardinal

Production
Zeffirelli's signature lush photography in Brother Sun, Sister Moon indicates that it was conceived and executed in much the same visual manner as his Academy Award-winning adaptation of Romeo and Juliet (1968). The film attempts to draw parallels between the work and philosophy of Saint Francis and the ideology that underpinned the worldwide counterculture movement of the 1960s and early 1970s. The film is also known for the score composed by Riz Ortolani.

Frank Grimes originally was offered the lead role of Francesco di Bernardone, but Zeffirelli changed his mind at the last minute and withdrew his offer. Al Pacino screen-tested for the role, but Zeffirelli objected to Pacino's theatrical style. Robin Askwith revealed in his autobiography that he was cast in the film but later was fired.

Lynne Frederick auditioned for the role of Clare of Assisi, and was first runner up. Candace Glendenning also tested for the role but was considered to be "too exotic-looking".

The film was nominated for an Oscar for Best Art Direction (Lorenzo Mongiardino, Gianni Quaranta, Carmelo Patrono).

Reception
Brother Sun, Sister Moon received mixed reviews on its release. Roger Ebert harshly criticized the film, writing that it had "an excess of sweetness and light", and that its dialogue consisted of "empty, pretty phrasing". The New York Times reviewer Vincent Canby similarly wrote that the film "confuses simplicity with simple-mindedness". Canby contrasted it negatively with The Flowers of St. Francis, a 1950 film on the same subject. Both reviewers especially criticized the scene where Francis appears before Pope Innocent III, calling it gaudy and excessive. Ebert wrote, "does the Pope always have 200 divines on hand just to hold an audience for a few barefoot monks?"

However, Christopher Hudson of The Spectator called Brother Sun, Sister Moon "a beautiful and simple film" and especially praised its cinematography, though he acknowledged "the limitations of the script".

On review aggregator website Rotten Tomatoes, the film holds an approval rating of 42% based on 19 reviews from critics, and an average rating of 4.9/10, while holding a rating of 77% from audiences, with an average rating of 4/5.

Soundtrack
The romantic soundtrack was by Riz Ortolani for the Italian film and Ken Thorne for the English language version with songs by the Scottish singer-songwriter Donovan, which reflected the 'flower power' mood of Zeffirelli's film and the cinematography in particular. Donovan also sang all the songs on the soundtrack itself. The soundtrack album mainly featured Riz Ortolani's music. In 2004, Donovan re-recorded the songs from the long out-of-print soundtrack. Brother Sun, Sister Moon was released exclusively on iTunes Store.

The composer Leonard Bernstein and lyricist Leonard Cohen were originally commissioned to provide a score, but after working on the project for about three months in Italy, they withdrew.<ref>[https://books.google.com/books?id=p44Jtck3VCAC&q=leonard%20bernstein%20%22brother%20sun%20sister%20moon%22&pg=PT203 Ira B. Nadel, Various Positions: A Life of Leonard Cohen]. Retrieved 3 April 2015</ref> However Bernstein used "A Simple Song", originally written for the film, in his Mass.Naxos. Retrieved 3 April 2015 Paul Simon was also approached for music and lyrics, but he too declined. However, a quatrain he wrote while considering the commission was later presented to Leonard Bernstein for use in his Mass''.

See also
List of historical drama films
Canticle of the Sun

References

External links
 
 

1972 films
Films about religion
Films about Christianity
Films about Catholicism
1970s biographical drama films
1970s historical drama films
1970s English-language films
English-language Italian films
Films directed by Franco Zeffirelli
Cultural depictions of Francis of Assisi
Films set in the 13th century
Films set in Italy
Films set in Umbria
Films set in Vatican City
Italian historical drama films
Italian biographical drama films
Films scored by Riz Ortolani
Paramount Pictures films
Films with screenplays by Suso Cecchi d'Amico
Biographical films about religious leaders
1970s Italian films